

List of Ambassadors

Naor Gilon 2021-
Ron Malka (Non-Resident, New Delhi) 2018 - 
Daniel Carmon (Non-Resident, New Delhi) 2014 - 2018
Mark Sofer (Non-Resident, New Delhi) 2007 - 2011
Brosh Zvi 1966 - 1968
Minister Eliashiv Ben-Horin (Non-Resident, Naypyidaw) 1960 - 1963
Minister Daniel Lewin (diplomat) (Non-Resident, Naypyidaw) 1957 - 1960

References

Sri Lanka
Israel